The 2021 ITF Féminin Le Neubourg was a professional women's tennis tournament played on outdoor hard courts. It was the first edition of the tournament which was part of the 2021 ITF Women's World Tennis Tour. It took place in Le Neubourg, France between 27 September and 3 October 2021.

Singles main-draw entrants

Seeds

 1 Rankings are as of 20 September 2021.

Other entrants
The following players received wildcards into the singles main draw:
  Manon Arcangioli
  Loïs Boisson
  Salma Djoubri
  Lucie Nguyen Tan

The following player received entry using a protected ranking:
  Tereza Smitková

The following player received entry as a junior exempt:
  Daria Snigur

The following players received entry from the qualifying draw:
  Audrey Albié
  Estelle Cascino
  Sarah Beth Grey
  Momoko Kobori
  Anna Kubareva
  Laura Pigossi
  Aravane Rezaï
  Iryna Shymanovich

The following player received entry as a lucky loser:
  Chiara Scholl

Champions

Singles

  Mihaela Buzărnescu def.  Anna Bondár, 6–1, 6–3

Doubles

  Robin Anderson /  Amandine Hesse def.  Estelle Cascino /  Sarah Beth Grey, 6–3, 7–6(7–2)

References

External links
 2021 ITF Féminin Le Neubourg at ITFtennis.com
 Official website

2021 ITF Women's World Tennis Tour
2021 in French tennis
September 2021 sports events in France
October 2021 sports events in France